Sergei Leonidovich Kozhanov (born 21 July 1964) is a former Russian professional footballer.

Club career
He made his professional debut in the Soviet Second League in 1980 for FC Dynamo Makhachkala.

Honours
 Soviet Top League runner-up: 1986.
 Soviet Cup winner: 1984.
 Russian Premier League runner-up: 1992.

References

1964 births
Footballers from Makhachkala
Living people
Soviet footballers
Russian footballers
Association football midfielders
Association football defenders
Soviet Top League players
Russian Premier League players
FC Dynamo Moscow players
FC Chornomorets Odesa players
FC Zimbru Chișinău players
FC Spartak Vladikavkaz players
SC Odesa players
Russian expatriate footballers
Expatriate footballers in Ukraine
FC Dynamo Makhachkala players